Breaking Away is the second studio album by British soul singer Jaki Graham, released in September 1986 through EMI Records. The album's production was credited to British singer-songwriter Derek Bramble.

The album was re-issued on CD in 23 August 2010 by Cherry Red Records.

Track listing
 

 Sides one and two were combined as tracks 1–12 on CD reissues.

Charts

References

1986 albums
Jaki Graham albums
Synth-pop albums by English artists
Disco albums by English artists